A , or , is an online entertainer who uses a virtual avatar generated using computer graphics. Real-time motion capture software or technology are often—but not always—used to capture movement. The digital trend originated in Japan in the mid-2010s, and has become an international online phenomenon in the early 2020s. A majority of VTubers are English and Japanese-speaking YouTubers or live streamers who use avatar designs. By 2020, there were more than 10,000 active VTubers. Although the term is an allusion to the video platform YouTube, they also use websites such as Niconico, Twitch, Facebook, Twitter, and Bilibili.

The first entertainer to use the phrase "virtual YouTuber", Kizuna AI, began creating content on YouTube in late 2016. Her popularity sparked a VTuber trend in Japan, and spurred the establishment of specialized agencies to promote them, including major ones such as Hololive Production, Nijisanji, and VShojo. Fan translations and foreign-language VTubers have marked a rise in the trend's international popularity. Virtual YouTubers have appeared in domestic advertising campaigns, and have broken livestream-related world records.

Overview 

Virtual YouTubers (although more commonly referred to as VTubers) are online entertainers who are typically YouTubers or live streamers. They use avatars created with programs such as Live2D, portraying characters designed by online artists. VTubers are not bound by physical limitations, and many of them engage in activities that are unconstrained by their real-world identity. Some VTubers, particularly those from marginalized communities, choose to use avatars to reflect their online identity for personal comfort and safety reasons. Transgender VTubers may use their avatars as a means to better reflect their preferred presentation to their audience.

VTubers often portray themselves as a kayfabe character, not unlike professional wrestling; Mace, a WWE wrestler who himself began streaming on Twitch as a VTuber in 2021, remarked that the two professions were "literally the same thing".

VTubers are associated with Japanese popular culture and aesthetics, such as anime and manga, and moe anthropomorphism with human or non-human traits. Some VTubers use anthropomorphic avatars, non-human characters such as animals.

Technology 

A VTuber's avatar is typically animated using a webcam and software, which captures the streamer's motions, expressions, and mouth movements, and maps them to a two- or three-dimensional model. Both free and paid programs have been developed for loading models and performing motion capture, with some capable of being used without a webcam (albeit with pre-determined animations), and some also supporting virtual reality hardware, or hand tracking devices such as the Leap Motion Controller. Some programs use iPhone smartphones—particularly, those that include Face ID—as an external webcam, using their infrared-illuminated sensor for more precise motion capture.

The proprietary animation software Live2D is typically used to rig two-dimensional models constructed from drawn textures, while programs such as VRoid Studio can be used to create three-dimensional models. Commissioned models can cost as high as US$2,000 depending on their level of detail. By contrast, some VTubers, colloquially known as "PNGTubers" (in reference to the PNG image format), use static sprites as opposed to a rigged model.

Alternative open-source software has been introduced, such as Inochi2D, which aims to serve the same purpose of Live2D in an open source manner. Such software is not backwards compatible with the Live2D standard, due to Live2D's anti-competitive license compatibility. There is also open source 3D VTubing software such as the Virtual Puppet Project (vpuppr) that is compatible with former proprietary 3D Vtubing software due to the model format's open source nature.

More recently, some Vtubers have introduced artificial intelligence into the design of their characters using AI-generated art and have even integrated AI into their core personality, gameplay, and chat interaction.

Agencies and commercialization 
Major VTubers are often employed by talent agencies, with business models influenced by those used by Japanese idol agencies. Streamers are employed by an agency to portray characters developed by the company, which are then commercialized via merchandising and other promotional appearances, as well as traditional revenue streams such as monetization of their videos, and viewer donations. The use of the term "graduation" to refer to a streamer retiring their character and/or leaving an agency, is also a holdover from the idol industry.

History

Predecessors 
On February 12, 2010, visual novel maker Nitroplus began uploading videos to its YouTube channel featuring an animated 3D version of its mascot Super Sonico, who would usually talk to the audience about herself or about releases related to the company. On June 13, 2011, UK-based Japanese vlogger Ami Yamato uploaded her first video, which featured an animated, virtual avatar speaking to the camera. In 2012, Japanese company Weathernews Inc. debuted a Vocaloid-styled character called Weatheroid Type A Airi on SOLiVE24, a 24-hour weather live stream on Nico Nico Douga, on YouTube and their website. In 2014, Airi got her own solo program every Thursday and began live broadcasting with motion capture.

In 2014 the FaceRig indie software launched on Indiegogo as an EU crowdfunding project, and later that year it was released on Steam becoming the first software suite that enabled live avatars at home via face motion capture that started being actively used on streaming websites and YouTube. The Live2D software module enabling 2D avatars and was added one year later in 2015 in collaboration with Live2D, Inc.

Breakout 

 
In late 2016, Kizuna AI, the first VTuber to achieve breakout popularity, made her debut on YouTube. She was the first to coin and use the term "virtual YouTuber". Created by digital production company Activ8 and voice-acted by Nozomi Kasuga, Kizuna AI created a sense of "real intimacy" with fans, as she was responsive to their questions. Within ten months, she had over two million subscribers and later became a culture ambassador of the Japan National Tourism Organization. Kizuna Ai's popularity can be attributed to the oversaturation of traditional webcam YouTubers and for aspects of characters that the audience would not expect. For example, despite having a friendly appearance, Kizuna Ai often swears in her videos when she gets frustrated while playing a game.

The VTuber trend 
Kizuna AI's sudden popularity sparked a VTuber trend.

In the beginning of 2018, Anycolor Inc. (then known as Ichikara) founded the VTuber agency Nijisanji. Nijisanji helped popularise the use of Live2D models instead of the prior focus on 3D models as well as the shift towards livestreaming instead of edited video and clips that was the standard for VTubers like Kizuna Ai. Cover Corporation, a company that was originally developing augmented and virtual reality software, shifted its focus to VTubers by establishing Hololive.

After their initial success in Japan, the trend began to expand internationally via their appeal to the anime and manga fandom. Agencies like Hololive and Nijisanji created branches in China, South Korea, Indonesia, and India, as well as English-language branches targeting a global audience. Meanwhile, independent VTubers began to appear in many countries, from Japan to the United States. In July 2018, VTubers had a collective subscriber count of 12.7 million, and more than 720 million total views. By January 2020, there were over 10,000 VTubers.

The COVID-19 pandemic led to an overall increase in viewership of video game live streaming in general in 2020, which helped contribute to the growth of VTubers into a mainstream phenomenon. Searches on Google for VTuber related content increased over 2020, leading towards the September 2020 launch of Hololive's English branch. VTubers accounted for 38% of YouTube's 300 most profitable channels, with a total revenue of US$26,229,911 (roughly half of which being viewer donations).

At the same time, the popularity of VTubers continued to rise on Twitch, with a host of several notable English-speaking VTubers such as VShojo members Projekt Melody and Ironmouse. Pokimane also experimented with avatar-based streams using a model commissioned from a VTuber artist.

In September 2020, Anycolor created an "Aggressive Acts and Slander Countermeasure Team" to offer counselling to victims of harassment and take legal measures against perpetrators of harassment, specifically the online harassment plaguing the Japanese entertainment industry. This announcement came in the wake of Hololive's VTuber Mano Aloe's retirement after only two weeks of activity due to online harassment.

YouTube's 2020 Culture and Trends report highlights VTubers as one of the notable trends of that year, with 1.5 billion views per month by October.

On March 30, 2021, Kizuna AI was chosen as one of Asia's top 60 influencers.

In May 2021, Twitch added a VTuber tag for streams as part of a wider expansion of its tag system.
In July 2021, Gawr Gura—a member of Hololive's first English branch—overtook Kizuna Ai as the most-subscribed VTuber on YouTube.

Cover's CEO Motoaki "Yagoo" Tanigo was selected as one of the Japan's Top 20 Entrepreneurs by Forbes Japan in its January 2022 issue. The following month, in the midst of a subathon event, Ironmouse accumulated the largest number of active paid subscriptions of all streamers on the platform at that point in time, although still behind an overall record previously set by Ludwig. According to data provided by parent company Amazon, VTubing content on Twitch grew by 467% in 2021 compared with a year earlier.

Use in marketing 

Due to their popularity, companies and organizations have used virtual YouTubers as a method of advertising or bringing attention to a product or service. When SoftBank announced the release of the iPhone XS and XS Max in 2018, Kizuna AI appeared at the event and promoted the products on her channel.

In August 2018, Wright Flyer Live Entertainment released a mobile application allowing VTubers to live stream videos while monetizing them and connecting with their viewers. In a news conference in Tokyo, the head of Wright Flyer Live Entertainment stated, "just increasing the number [of VTubers] is not that effective. We want them to keep on doing their activities. [To do that], gaining fans and monetization are essential. So, we are providing a platform to support that". This followed Wright Flyer Live Entertainment's parent company Gree, Inc.'s ¥10 billion ($89.35 million) investment in VTubers, as well as a ¥10 billion sales target by 2020.

On June 24, 2019, VTuber Kaguya Luna, in collaboration with Nissin Foods to advertise its Yakisoba UFO noodles, held a live stream with a smartphone attached to a helium balloon.

Some organizations and companies have employed their own VTuber characters as mascots within marketing. These include the government of Japan's Ibaraki Prefecture (which developed the character of Ibaraki Hiyori), the streaming service Netflix (which developed the character N-ko to appear in videos promoting its anime content), Sega (who planned to have in-character streams with Sonic the Hedgehog and his Japanese voice actor Jun'ichi Kanemaru), and anime streaming service Crunchyroll (which launched a YouTube channel for its mascot Crunchyroll-Hime in October 2021). The Fukuoka SoftBank Hawks baseball team has two VTuber mascots, named Takamine Umi (also known as Hawk Kannon Sea) and Aritaka Hina, both unveiled in 2020. They have their own YouTube channel and their own Twitter accounts. Occasionally, they make appearances on the Fukuoka PayPay Dome's videoboard.

In 2021, Hololive English member Gawr Gura made a cameo appearance in an anime-themed ad by American fast food chain Taco Bell (which premiered to coincide with the 2020 Summer Olympics in Tokyo).

Good Smile Company has begun producing nendoroids of Kizuna Ai in 2018, with a full push for various Japanese and international VTuber PVC-made statues since the 2020s.

In 2020, Japanese VTubers Ayapan and Jajami were invited by the Brazilian embassy in Tokyo, Japan, in November to present their content made for the Brazilian public and how VTuber works, where they had a meeting with Ambassador Eduardo Paes Saboia, being the first contact of VTubers with a Brazilian authority.

See also 

 Aniforms
 Avatar (computing)
 Content creation
 Internet celebrity
 Japanese idol
 Japanese popular culture
 Video gaming in Japan 
 Virtual actor
 Virtual character (for other virtual personality concepts)
 Virtual idol
 Virtual influencer

References

Further reading

External links 
 

 
 
2010s fads and trends
2020s fads and trends
2010s in Internet culture
2020s in Internet culture
2010s neologisms
Cultural trends
Internet culture
Otaku
Wasei-eigo